Thais of Athens is a historical novel by Ivan Efremov written in 1972. It tells the story of the famous hetaera Thaïs, who was one of Alexander the Great's contemporaries and companions on his conquest of the oikoumene or the known world. The book combines the life of the historical and a fictional Tais.

It follows such actual events as the burning of Persepolis by Tais and her becoming Ptolemy's Egyptian queen, but also speculates on a love affair with Alexander and Tais's initiation in some of the obscure religions of the ancient world.
In the novel, the very young (only 17 years old) and already famous Athenian hetaera Tais meets the exiled heir to the Macedonian throne and his childhood friends Hephaestion, Nearchus and Ptolemy.
She then travels to Sparta and Crete with the Macedonians, visits Egypt and Mesopotamia, where she becomes an initiate in the temple of Ashtoreth (Astarte) and eventually follows Alexander to Persepolis, which she requests be set on fire. After Alexander's death, Tais marries Ptolemy and becomes the queen of Memphis.

Her travels are an interesting and entertaining look into the lives and customs of people in Hellenistic times, as well as an excellent source of basic information on the geography and history of the age and Alexander the Great.

1972 novels
1972 in the Soviet Union
Cultural depictions of Alexander the Great
Cultural depictions of Thaïs
Historical novels
Novels set in ancient Greece
Novels by Ivan Yefremov
Novels about royalty
Novels set in the 4th century BC